Astropolis (from the Greek for city of stars) may refer to:

In literature 
 An idealised future civilisation, as in Eugene Jolas' Succession in Astropolis
 Astropolis, a science fiction cycle by Sean Williams

Fictional structures 

 Astropolis, a space station proposed by Krafft Arnold Ehricke
 "Astropolis: The First Space Resort", in Playboy magazine, November, 1968
 Asteromo, an orbiting arcology proposed by architect Paolo Soleri, sometimes called an Astropolis